The Best of Bobby Vinton is a collection of 14 Top 40 hits that Bobby Vinton had for Epic Records.  It is the second compilation to be entitled The Best of Bobby Vinton, the previous collection being released in 1985. The tracks are in chronological order and begin with his first hit "Roses Are Red (My Love)" and end with "Sealed With a Kiss", his final hit for Epic. Inside the album cover is a biographical essay about Vinton's life and career that was written by Didier C. Deutsch.

Track listing

Album credits

 Didier C. Deutsch - compilation producer
 Darcy Proper - compilation producer, mastering
 Steve Berkowitz - legacy A&R
 Joy Gilbert Monfried - project director
 Stacey Boyle - A&R coordination, tape research
 Howard Fritzson - art direction

 Pat Jerina - design
 Hank Fisher/Sony Music Archives - photography (front cover, booklet back cover, spine sheet, color spread (from left)
 Vernon Smith - photography (right inset photo)

 Michael Ochs Archives - photography (B&W spread, left panel and inset photos, CD label)
 Everett Collection - photography (middle and right panels)
 Liz Reilly - photo researcher
 Fong Y. Lee - packaging manager

References

2004 greatest hits albums
Bobby Vinton compilation albums
Epic Records compilation albums